The following are notable events in the Timeline of immunology:

 2600 BCE – Imhotep uses poultice on an open wound in breast cancer to induce infection and destroy the tumor.
 1549 – The earliest account of inoculation of smallpox (variolation) occurs in Wan Quan's (1499–1582) Douzhen Xinfa (痘疹心法).
 1718 – Smallpox inoculation in Ottoman Empire realized by West, and Henry Kipkosgei , recorded the positive effects of variolation.
 1761 – A case of breast cancer cured after ulcerating and getting infected is reported by Lambergen 
 1796 – First demonstration of smallpox vaccination (Edward Jenner)
 1808 – 1813 - First experimental demonstration of the germ theory of disease by Agostino Bassi though he does not formally propose the theory until 1844
 1813 – Vautier reports spontaneous remission of cancer after gangrene infection (later to be known as Clostridium perfringens)
 1829 – Another case of spontaneous remission of breast cancer after a patient refused surgery and the tumor ruptured, became infected and during a febrile illness with purulent discharge, it shrunk and disappeared after a few weeks. (Guillaume Dupuytren)
 1837 – Description of the role of microbes in putrefaction and fermentation (Theodore Schwann)
 1838 – Confirmation of the role of yeast in fermentation of sugar to alcohol (Charles Cagniard-Latour)
 1850 – Demonstration of the contagious nature of puerperal fever (childbed fever) (Ignaz Semmelweis)
 1857–1870 – Confirmation of the role of microbes in fermentation (Louis Pasteur)
 1862 – Phagocytosis (Ernst Haeckel)
 1867 – Aseptic practice in surgery using carbolic acid (Joseph Lister)
 1868 – Busch discovered that a sarcoma patient being surgically intervened to remove the tumor, after being exposed to a patient suffering from erysipelas, got a skin infection and her tumor disappeared. He inoculated some other cancer patients with many successes.
 1876 – Demonstration that microbes can cause disease-anthrax (Robert Koch)
 1877 – Mast cells (Paul Ehrlich)
 1878 – Confirmation and popularization of the germ theory of disease (Louis Pasteur)
 1880 – 81 Theory that bacterial virulence could be attenuated by culture in vitro and used as vaccines. Used to make chicken cholera and anthrax "vaccines" (Louis Pasteur)
 1882 – Identification of Streptococcus pyogenes as the causative agent of erysipelas (Friedrich Fehleisen). He repeats Busch experiments inoculating cancer patients with eryisipelas, noting tumor regression in many of them.
 1883 – 1905 – Cellular theory of immunity via phagocytosis by macrophages and microphages (polymorhonuclear leukocytes) (Elie Metchnikoff)
 1885 – Introduction of concept of a "therapeutic vaccination". Report of a live "attenuated" vaccine for rabies (Louis Pasteur and Pierre Paul Émile Roux).
 1888 – Identification of bacterial toxins (diphtheria bacillus) (Pierre Roux and Alexandre Yersin)
 1888 – Bactericidal action of blood (George Nuttall)
 1890 – Demonstration of antibody activity against diphtheria and tetanus toxins. Beginning of humoral theory of immunity. (Emil von Behring) and (Kitasato Shibasaburō)
 1891 – Demonstration of cutaneous (delayed type) hypersensitivity (Robert Koch)
 1893 – Use of live bacteria and bacterial lysates to treat tumors-"Coley's Toxins", based on Busch and Fehleisen experiences (William B. Coley)
 1894 – Bacteriolysis (Richard Pfeiffer)
 1896 – An antibacterial, heat-labile serum component (complement) is described (Jules Bordet)
 1900 – Antibody formation theory (Paul Ehrlich)
 1901 – Blood groups (Karl Landsteiner)
 1902 – Immediate hypersensitivity anaphylaxis (Paul Portier) and (Charles Richet)
 1903 – Intermediate hypersensitivity, the "Arthus reaction" (Maurice Arthus)
 1903 – Opsonization
 1905 – "Serum sickness" allergy (Clemens von Pirquet and (Bela Schick)
 1909 – Paul Ehrlich proposes "immune surveillance" hypothesis of tumor recognition and eradication
 1911 – 2nd demonstration of filterable agent that caused tumors (Peyton Rous)
 1917 – Hapten (Karl Landsteiner)
 1921 – Cutaneous allergic reactions (Otto Prausnitz and Heinz Küstner)
 1924 – Reticuloendothelial system
 1938 – Antigen-Antibody binding hypothesis (John Marrack)
 1940 – Identification of the Rh antigens (Karl Landsteiner and Alexander Weiner)
 1942 – Anaphylaxis (Karl Landsteiner and Merill Chase)
 1942 – Adjuvants (Jules Freund and Katherine McDermott)
 1944 – hypothesis of allograft rejection
 1945 – Coombs test  antiglobulin test (AGT)
 1946 – Identification of mouse MHC (H2) by George Snell and Peter A. Gorer
 1948 – Antibody production in plasma B cells (Astrid Fagraeus)
 1949 – Growth of polio virus in tissue culture, neutralization, and demonstration of attenuation of neurovirulence (John Enders) and (Thomas Weller) and (Frederick Robbins)
 1951 – A vaccine against yellow fever
 1953 – Graft-versus-host disease
 1953 – Validation of immunological tolerance hypothesis
 1957 – Clonal selection theory (Frank Macfarlane Burnet)
 1957 – Discovery of interferon by Alick Isaacs and Jean Lindenmann
 1958–1962 – Discovery of human leukocyte antigens (Jean Dausset and others)
 1959–1962 – Discovery of antibody structure (independently elucidated by Gerald Edelman and Rodney Porter)
 1959 – Discovery of lymphocyte circulation (James Gowans)
 1960 – Discovery of lymphocyte "blastogenic transformation" and proliferation in response to mitogenic lectins-phytohemagglutinin (PHA) (Peter Nowell)
 1961–1962 Discovery of thymus involvement in cellular immunity (Jacques Miller)
 1960 – Radioimmunoassay – (Rosalyn Sussman Yalow) 
 1961 – Demonstration that glucocorticoids inhibit PHA-induced lymphocyte proliferation (Peter Nowell)
 1963 – Development of the plaque assay for the enumeration of antibody-forming cells in vitro by Niels Jerne and Albert Nordin
 1963 – Gell and Coombs classification of hypersensitivity
 1964–1968 – T and B cell cooperation in immune response
 1965 – Discovery of lymphocyte mitogenic activity, "blastogenic factor" (Shinpei Kamakura) and (Louis Lowenstein) (J. Gordon) and (L.D. MacLean)
 1965 – Discovery of "immune interferon" (gamma interferon) (E.F. Wheelock)
 1965 – Secretory immunoglobulins
 1967 – Identification of IgE as the reaginic antibody (Kimishige Ishizaka)
 1968 – Passenger leukocytes identified as significant immunogens in allograft rejection (William L. Elkins and Ronald D. Guttmann)
 1969 – The lymphocyte cytolysis Cr51 release assay (Theodore Brunner) and (Jean-Charles Cerottini)
 1971 – Peter Perlmann and Eva Engvall at Stockholm University invented ELISA
 1972 – Structure of the antibody molecule
 1973 – Dendritic Cells first described by Ralph M. Steinman
 1974 – Immune Network Hypothesis (Niels Jerne)
 1974 – T-cell restriction to MHC (Rolf Zinkernagel and (Peter C. Doherty)
 1975 – Generation of monoclonal antibodies (Georges Köhler) and (César Milstein)
 1975 – Discovery of Natural Killer cells (Rolf Kiessling, Eva Klein, Hans Wigzell)
 1976 – Identification of somatic recombination of immunoglobulin genes (Susumu Tonegawa)
 1980–1983 – Discovery and characterization of interleukins, 1 and 2 IL-1 IL-2 (Robert Gallo, Kendall A. Smith, Tadatsugu Taniguchi)
 1983 – Discovery of the T cell antigen receptor TCR (Ellis Reinherz) (Philippa Marrack) and (John Kappler) (James Allison)
 1983 – Discovery of HIV (Luc Montagnier) (Françoise Barré-Sinoussi) (Robert Gallo)
 1985–1987 – Identification of genes for the T cell receptor
 1986 – Hepatitis B vaccine produced by genetic engineering
 1986 – Th1 vs Th2 model of T helper cell function (Timothy Mosmann)
 1988 – Discovery of biochemical initiators of T-cell activation: CD4- and CD8-p56lck complexes (Christopher E. Rudd)
 1990 – Gene therapy for SCID
 1991 – Role of peptide for MHC Class II structure (Scheherazade Sadegh-Nasseri & Ronald N. Germain)
 1992 – Discovery of transitional B cells (David Allman & Michael Cancro)
 1994 – Danger model of immunological tolerance (Polly Matzinger)
 1995 – James P. Allison describes the function of CTLA-4
 1995 – Regulatory T cells (Shimon Sakaguchi)
 1995 – First Dendritic cell vaccine trial reported by Mukherji et al.
 1996 – 1998 – Identification of Toll-like receptors
 1997 – Discovery of the autoimmune regulator and the AIRE gene.
 2000 – Characterization of M1 and M2 macrophage subsets by Charles Mills
 2001 – Discovery of FOXP3 – the gene directing regulatory T cell development
 2005 – Development of human papillomavirus vaccine (Ian Frazer)
 2006 – Antigen-specific NK cell memory first reported by Ulrich von Andrian's group after discovery by Mahmoud Goodarzi
 2010 – The first autologous cell-based cancer vaccine, provenge, is approved by the FDA for the treatment of metastatic, asymptomatic stage IV prostate cancer.
 2010 – First immune checkpoint inhibitor, ipilimumab (anti-CTLA-4), is approved by the FDA for treatment of stage IV melanoma
 2011 – Carl H. June reports first successful use of CAR T-cells expressing the 4-1BB costimulatory signaling domain for the treatment of CD19+ malignancies
 2014 – A second class of immune checkpoint inhibitor (anti-PD-1) is approved by the FDA for the treatment of melanoma. Pembrolizumab and nivolumab are approved within months of each other.
 2016 – Halpert and Konduri first characterize the role of dendritic cell CTLA-4 in Th immune polarization
 2016 – A third class of immune checkpoint inhibitor, anti-PD-L1 (atezolizumab), is approved for the treatment of bladder cancer
 2017 – First autologous CAR T-cell therapy tisagenlecleucel approved for the treatment of pediatric B-ALL; second autologous CAR T-cell therapy axicabtagene ciloleucel (Yescarta) is approved.
 2020 – The first mRNA vaccines (BNT162b2, mRNA-1273), are developed for SARS-CoV-2 infection; this new technology completed design, testing, and emergency approval in under one year.

References

History of immunology
Medicine timelines
Biology timelines